Ádám Miklósi (born 25 September 1962) is a Hungarian ethologist, expert on dog cognition and behavior. He holds the position of professor and the head of the Ethology Department at the Faculty of Sciences of the Eötvös Loránd University in Budapest, Hungary. In 2016 he was elected as a corresponding member of the Hungarian Academy of Sciences. He is the co-founder and leader of the Family Dog Project, which aims to study human-dog interaction from an ethological perspective. In 2014 he published the 2nd edition of an academic volume entitled Dog Behaviour, Evolution, and Cognition by Oxford University Press

Bibliography 
 List of publications at the MTMT
 List of publications at Google scholar

Books 
Dog Behaviour, Evolution, and Cognition
The Dog - A Natural History

References

External links
Ádám Miklósi's cv at the Department of Ethology, Eötvös Loránd University
Family Dog Project
Newly elected members of the HAS, 2016
Canine Science Forum 2008
Canine Science Forum 2018

1962 births
Living people
Animal cognition writers
Academic staff of Eötvös Loránd University
Ethologists
Members of the Hungarian Academy of Sciences
Hungarian biologists